Milliken Airport  is an airport serving Kabwe, a city in the Central Province of Zambia. The airport is on the west side of the city.

See also

Transport in Zambia
List of airports in Zambia

References

External links
OpenStreetMap - Milliken Airport
OurAirports - Milliken Airport

 Google Earth

Airports in Zambia
Kabwe
Buildings and structures in Central Province, Zambia